José Luis Villanueva (March 19, 1913 – November 11, 1983) was an amateur boxer from the Philippines who represented his country at the 1932 Los Angeles Olympics. Born in Binondo, Manila, he won the bronze medal in the bantamweight class after winning the fight for third place against Joseph Lang.

His son, Anthony Villanueva, also became a boxer, and won a silver medal during the 1964 Tokyo Olympics.

1932 Olympic results
Below are the results of boxer José Villanueva who competed for the Philippines as a bantamweight at the 1932 Olympic boxing tournament in Los Angeles.

 Round of 16: bye
 Quarterfinal: defeated Akira Nakao (Japan) on points
 Semifinal: lost to Horace Gwynne (Canada) on points
 Bronze Medal Bout: won by walkover over Joseph Lang (USA)

Later life
Villanueva became a boxing trainer. One of his trained fighters was Gabriel Elorde who won a world 130-pound title and held it for seven years. Villanueva died of heart attack in 1983.

References

External links
 

1913 births
1983 deaths
Olympic boxers of the Philippines
Boxers at the 1932 Summer Olympics
Olympic bronze medalists for the Philippines
Olympic medalists in boxing
Medalists at the 1932 Summer Olympics
Filipino male boxers
People from Binondo
Sportspeople from Manila
Boxers from Metro Manila
Bantamweight boxers
Philippine Sports Hall of Fame inductees